The 2023 Portland Timbers season is the 37th season in their existence and the 13th season for the Portland Timbers in Major League Soccer (MLS), the top-flight professional soccer league in the United States and Canada. The season covers the period from the end of the Timber's last match in MLS or MLS Playoffs in 2022 (October 9, 2022) to their final match in MLS or MLS Playoffs in 2023.

Background

Season review by month

February

On February 27, Portland hosted Sporting Kansas City for the home opener after a postponed match that was set for Saturday 25 due to heavy snow and ice.  Portland scored the first goal in the 6th minute by Juan Mosquera (assisted by Yimmi Chará) to give the Timbers their first win of the season.

March
On March 4, Portland traveled to Los Angeles, California to play Los Angeles Football Club at the newly named BMO Stadium.  Portland was able to almost catch up after being down by 3 with a final score of 2-3.  The goalscorers were Evander (assist by: J. Mosquera) in the 62nd minute and C. Paredes (assist by: Nathan Fogaça) in the 84th minute.

On March 13, Portland announced the signing of Ivorian forward Franck Boli to a one-year contract with a club option for the 2024 season.

Team kits
Supplier: Adidas / Sponsor: Alaska Air

Coaching staff and front office

Executive staff

Coaching staff

Stadiums

Squad information

First team

 

 (HG) = Homegrown Player
 (GA) = Generation Adidas Player
 (DP) = Designated Player
 (INT) = Player using International Roster Slot
 (U22) = Player using U22 Initiative Slot
 (L) = On Loan to the Timbers
 (LO) = Loaned out to another club
 (SEIL) = Season-ending Injury List

Second team

eMLS team

Competitions

Competitions overview
{| class="wikitable" style="text-align: center"
|-
!rowspan=2|Competition
!colspan=8|Record
!Start Round
!First Match
!Last Match
!Final Position (Conference)
|-
!
!
!
!
!
!
!
!
!colspan=4|
|-
| Major League Soccer

|1
|February 27, 2023
|TBD
|TBD (TBD Western)
|-
| MLS Cup Playoffs

|TBD
|TBD
|TBD
|TBD
|-
| U.S. Open Cup

|TBD
|TBD
|TBD
|TBD
|-
! Total

!colspan=4|

Major League Soccer

Preseason

MLS Regular season

Western Conference

Overall standings

Matches

Results by match round

Results by location

Cascadia Cup

Standings

Matches

MLS Cup Playoffs

U.S. Open Cup

Leagues Cup

West 1 Group

Standings

Matches

Transfers
Per league and club policy, terms of the deals are not disclosed except Targeted Allocation Money, General Allocation Money, draft picks, and international rosters spots.

Transfers in

Loans in

Loans out

References

Portland Timbers (MLS) seasons
2023 Major League Soccer season
2023 in Portland, Oregon
American soccer clubs 2023 season
2023 in sports in Oregon